Le Monnier is the remnant of a lunar impact crater that has been partly inundated by lava flows. It was named after French astronomer Pierre Charles Le Monnier. It is located on the eastern edge of Mare Serenitatis, and the western part of the rim is missing so that it now forms a large bay. To the north is the crater Chacornac.

The interior of this formation is relatively flat and smooth, with no significant craterlets to mark the surface. The outer rim is battered, worn, and notched with past impacts. Only slight wrinkle ridges now mark where the western rim once lay.

The landing site of the Luna 21 space probe is located near the southern rim of Le Monnier. Lunokhod 2, a robotic roving vehicle deposited on the surface by Luna 21, covered a distance of 37 kilometers across the crater floor. It also surveyed the southern edge of the crater rim.

Satellite craters

By convention these features are identified on lunar maps by placing the letter on the side of the crater midpoint that is closest to Le Monnier. 

The following craters have been renamed by the IAU.
 Le Monnier B — See Very (lunar crater).
 Le Monnier C — See Borel (crater).

References

External links

Lunokhod 2 traverse overview, path of Lunokhod 2 in southern Le Monnier crater
 LTO-43A4 Le Monnier — L&PI topographic map.

Impact craters on the Moon